Pseudanidorus is a genus of beetles belonging to the family Aderidae.

The species of this genus are found in Europe.

Species:
 Pseudanidorus cyprius (Baudi, 1877) 
 Pseudanidorus laesicollis (Fairmaire, 1883)

References

Aderidae